The Prioress Stakes is an American Grade II Thoroughbred horse race held annually during the eight-week meet at Saratoga Race Course in Saratoga Springs, New York.

Inaugurated in 1948 at Jamaica Racetrack, it was raced there through 1959 after which it was hosted by Aqueduct Racetrack through 1986. It was run at Belmont Park from 1987 through 2011 before being moved to Saratoga Race Course in 2012, where it remains on the stakes schedule. The Prioress was named for the filly Prioress, out of the great mare Reel, herself by Glencoe. In 1858, Prioress became the first American Thoroughbred ever to win in England.

The Prioress Stakes was run in two divisions in 1951 and again in 1958.

This race was downgraded to a Grade II for its 2014 running.

Records
Speed record:
 1:08.26 – Xtra Heat (2001)

Most wins by a jockey:
 4 – John Velazquez (1994, 1996, 2002, 2008)

Most wins by a trainer:
 3 – Bob Baffert (2004, 2008, 2018)

Most wins by an owner:
 3 – Happy Valley Farm (1970, 1986, 1988)

Winners

* † In 1966, Priceless Gem finished first but was disqualified and set back to last.

References

External links
 The Prioress Stakes at Belmont Park

Graded stakes races in the United States
Grade 2 stakes races in the United States
Horse races in New York (state)
Flat horse races for three-year-old fillies
Recurring sporting events established in 1948
Belmont Park
Jamaica Race Course
1948 establishments in New York (state)